The Southern Reach Trilogy is a series of novels by the American author Jeff VanderMeer first published in 2014—Annihilation, Authority, and Acceptance. The trilogy takes its name from the secret agency that is central to the plot. In 2013, Paramount Pictures bought the movie rights for the series, and a film adaptation of Annihilation was made with Alex Garland as writer-director. The film was released in 2018.

"Area X"
In the series, Southern Reach is a secret agency that manages expeditions into a place known as Area X, an uninhabited and abandoned coastal area of an unnamed country which nature is gradually reclaiming. It is the main setting for Annihilation.

Influences
VanderMeer has said that the main inspiration for Area X was a hike through St. Marks National Wildlife Refuge. However, he has also said that dreams inspired such elements as the writing in the tower from Annihilation. Moreover, VanderMeer has cited a number of books as having an influence on Southern Reach such as The Other Side of the Mountain by Michel Bernanos.

Release
The trilogy was released in quick succession over an 8-month period in what has been called an innovative "Netflix-inspired strategy". The strategy helped the trilogy's second and third books reach the New York Times Best Seller list and established VanderMeer as "one of the most forward-thinking authors of the decade".

Reception
The series was positively received by critics. Slate called the trilogy one of "the most uncompromising — yet most rewarding — genre series", while author Stephen King called it "creepy and fascinating". Writing about the final book, Acceptance, The New York Times said "VanderMeer has created an immersive and wonderfully realized world", and that the trilogy as a whole is a "pure reading pleasure". Annihilation won the Nebula and Shirley Jackson Awards for Best Novel. The entire trilogy was also named a finalist for the 2015 World Fantasy Award and the 2016 Kurd-Laßwitz-Preis.

Film adaptation

The first novel, Annihilation, was adapted into a film by director Alex Garland, starring Natalie Portman, Gina Rodriguez, Tessa Thompson, Jennifer Jason Leigh, and Oscar Isaac. It was released on February 23, 2018.

References

Further reading

External links
 
 
 VanderMeer, Jeff. The Nature Of Reading: 10 Influences On The Southern Reach Trilogy, Huffington Post, 27 July 2014.

2014 American novels
American science fiction novels
Literary trilogies
Weird fiction novels
Farrar, Straus and Giroux books